This is a list of music-related events in 1820.

Events
Pietro Raimondi returns to Naples and begins his career as an opera composer.
The Musical Fund Society is founded at Musical Fund Hall in Philadelphia. Its first public concert on April 22, 1821 featured Beethoven's 2nd Symphony.
Franz Liszt plays in public for the first time in Ödenburg.

Classical music
Ludwig van Beethoven – Piano Sonata No. 30
Franz Berwald – Violin Concerto in C sharp minor, Op. 2 
Fanny Mendelssohn-Hensel –  "Annette", H-U 14 
Friedrich Kuhlau 
3 Sonatinas, Op.20
Fantasy and Variations, Op.25
Felix Mendelssohn 
"Raste Krieger, Krieg ist aus" MWV K 2
Violin Sonata in F major, MWV Q 7
Recitativo in E minor, MWV U 11
Piano Piece in E minor, MWV U 12
Piano Piece in E minor, MWV U 18
Ignaz Moscheles – Piano Concerto No.3, Op.58 
Ferdinand Ries – Sextet, Op.100 (On "The Last Rose of Summer") 
Friedrich Schneider – Das Weltgericht, Op.46 
Franz Schubert
Lazarus, oratorio
Quartettsatz, D. 703
Psalm 23, D.706
Louis Spohr
Grand Rondo in G major for violin and piano, Op. 51
Potpourri on Irish Themes in A major, Op. 59
Potpourri on Themes from Mozart's Die Zauberflöte for violin and piano in F-sharp minor, Op. 50
Quintet for piano and winds in C minor, Op. 52
Symphony No. 2 in D minor, Op. 49
Violin Concerto No. 9 in D minor, Op. 55

Opera
Juan Crisóstomo Arriaga – Los Esclavos Felices
Friedrich Kuhlau – Elisa, Op.29 (premiered April 17)
Giovanni Pacini – La schiava di Bagdad (première October 28 at Teatro Carignano, Turin)
Gioacchino Rossini – Maometto II (premiered Dec. 3 in Naples)
Franz Schubert – Sakuntala, D. 701 (started, never finished)

Published popular music
"Hail to the Chief" – words, Sir Walter Scott; music James Sanderson
"D'ye Ken John Peel" – words, John Woodcock Graves. music traditional.

Births
January 9 – Pavel Křížkovský, conductor and composer (d. 1885)
February 10 – Cornelius Gurlitt, composer (d. 1901)
February 17 – Henri Vieuxtemps, violinist and composer (d. 1881)
March 24 – Fanny Crosby, American lyricist (d. 1915)
May 21 – Michel Lentz, lyricist of the Luxembourg national anthem (d. 1893)
June 22 – Franz Kroll, pianist (died 1877)
July 7 – George Cooper, organist (died 1876)
July 20 – Enrico Crivelli, Italian opera singer (d. 1870)
July 26 – Maria Severa Onofriana, Portuguese singer and guitarist, considered the founder of fado (d. 1846)
August 13 – George Grove, music writer (d. 1900)
August 30 – George Frederick Root, songwriter (d. 1895)
September 5 – Louis Köhler, pianist, composer and conductor (d. 1886)
October 6 – Jenny Lind, Swedish singer (d. 1887)
December 17 – Karl Anton Eckert, conductor and composer (d. 1879)
date unknown 
Maria Severa Onofriana, fado singer (d. 1846)
Anna-Kajsa Norman, Swedish folk musician (d. 1903)

Deaths
February 2 – Peder Schall, composer (b. 1762)
March 26 – Jean-Étienne Despréaux, French dancer, choreographer and composer (b. 1748)
August 6 – Antonín Vranický, Bohemian violinist and composer (b. 1761)
August 28 – Antonín Kraft, cellist and composer (b. 1749)
October 3 – Ludwig Wenzel Lachnith, horn player and composer (b. 1746)
date unknown – Marie Bigot, piano teacher (b. 1786)
probable
Mikhail Matinsky, scientist, writer and composer (b. 1750)
Louis Joseph Saint-Amans, composer (b. 1749)

References

 
19th century in music
Music by year